The Residents Associations of Epsom and Ewell is a local political party in the borough of Epsom and Ewell in Surrey, England. They have held majority control of Epsom and Ewell Borough Council since its formation in 1937.  The party is sometimes recorded as Other in national results lists and otherwise recorded alongside residents associations with a single Articles of Association. It consists of ward or multiple ward based residents associations with their own candidate selection rules. These include Ewell Court Residents' Association, Epsom Town Residents' Association and West Ewell and Ruxley Residents’ Association.

History 
The majority of Residents' Associations were formed from the expansion of housing provision in the 1930s, with the aim of bettering the lives of residents and forming a community. This tradition of forming residents' groups on new developments in the borough continues today, such as with Clarendon Park Residents' Association, which was formed in 2001.

Traditionally, throughout the UK, local councillors would stand as independents. However, throughout the 20th century, it became common for councillors to be elected with a party affiliation. Today, Epsom and Ewell Borough Council and Uttlesford District Council are the only two councils in England where Residents' Associations have overall control.

Structure 
There are eleven independent Residents Associations that form the Residents' Associations of Epsom and Ewell.  The Standing Committee of Residents Associations (SCoRA) provides a forum for the Residents' Associations to discuss common issues or borough-wide concerns. These meetings are for the Chair and Secretary of the respective groups; however, councillors may be asked to attend these forums to update SCoRA on progress or concerns with the council.

Election results

Epsom and Ewell Borough Council 
The RA contests all 38 available ward councillor seats and are the controlling group on Epsom and Ewell Borough Council. They currently have 32 elected councillors in the following multiple member wards:  

Auriol – 2 of 2
College – 1 of 3
Court – 0 of 3
Cuddington – 3 of 3
Ewell – 3 of 3
Ewell Court – 3 of 3
Nonsuch – 3 of 3
Ruxley – 3 of 3
Stamford – 2 of 3
Stoneleigh – 3 of 3
Town – 3 of 3
West Ewell – 3 of 3
Woodcote – 3 of 3

Surrey County Council 
Candidates from local residents associations contest county elections under the banner of the Residents Associations of Epsom and Ewell, which is a registered political party. This differs from borough elections, where some residents associations are registered as political parties in their own right, while some are not. The RAs of Epsom & Ewell currently have four elected county councillors, in the following single member divisions:

Ewell
Ewell Court, Auriol & Cuddington
West Ewell
Epsom Town and Downs

The other division has a Conservative councillor:

Epsom West

Notes 

1.By-elections were held in Cuddington ward in 2021 and West Ewell ward in 2022, following the deaths of two councillors.

References

Bibliography

External links 
 

Epsom and Ewell
Locally based political parties in England
Politics of Surrey